Hanta may refer to:
 
 Viruses: 
 Hantavirus
 Hantaan River virus
 Hantā Hantā, Hepburn reading of Hunter × Hunter, an anime and manga franchise
 Hánta, village of Kisbér District, Hungary
 Hanţa, village of Podu Turcului commune in Romania